2Pie Island is the first and only album by British electronica group 2 Bit Pie, considered to be an incarnation of Fluke. The instrumental version of "Here I Come" was featured in the Electronic Arts video games Tiger Woods PGA Tour 07 and The Sims Pet Stories.

Track listing

References

Fluke (band) albums
One Little Independent Records albums
2006 debut albums